Arthrocereus rondonianus is a species of plant in the family Cactaceae. It is endemic to Brazil.  Its natural habitats are dry savanna and rocky areas, and it is currently threatened by habitat loss.

References

Endemic flora of Brazil
Vulnerable plants
rondonianus
Taxonomy articles created by Polbot